The Archdeacon of Dunkeld was the only archdeacon in the Diocese of Dunkeld, acting as a deputy of the Bishop of Dunkeld. The following is a list of archdeacons:

List of archdeacons of Dunkeld
 Jocelin, 1177-1194
 Henry, 1200 x 1209-1220 x 1225
 William de Ednam, 1221 x 1225-1245
 John de Everley, 1251 x 1257-1263 x 1272
 W [...], fl. 1282
 Matthew de Kinross, 1263 x-1304
 William de Pilmuir, 1329-1330 x
 Robert de Den, 1340-1347 x 1349
 Walter de Wardlaw, 1349
 Adam Pullur, 1351-1351 x 1352
 John de Ethie, 1352
 Ingram de Ketenis, 1351 x 1359-1398 x 1407
 Richard de Cornell, 1398 x 1407-1408
 Richard Hunter, x 1408
 Alexander de Lilliesleaf, 1408-1415
 Alexander de Lauder, 1415-1440
 John Stewart, 1418
 Ingram Lindsay, 1421
 James Bruce, 1440-1441
 Adam de Montgomery, 1440-1455
 John Carrick, 1455-1468
 James Lindsay, 1465
 Nicholas Graham, 1467
 William Livingstone, 1468
 David Luthirdale, 1475-1479
 William Elphinstone, x 1476
 Alexander Tours, 1492-1507
 George Ferne, 1508-1517 x 1518
 John Carnavel, 1512
 William Meldrum, 1517 x 1518-1527
 David Meldrum, 1532-1550
 David Spens, 1547-1586
 James Spens, 1581
 John Ramsay, 1591 x 1610-1618
 Alexander Bruce, 1619-1633

Notes

Bibliography
 Lawrie, Sir Archibald, Early Scottish Charters Prior to A.D. 1153, (Glasgow, 1905)
 Watt, D.E.R., Fasti Ecclesiae Scotinanae Medii Aevi ad annum 1638, 2nd Draft, (St Andrews, 1969), pp. 119–22

See also
 Bishop of Dunkeld

Dunkeld
History of the Scottish Highlands
History of Perth and Kinross
Religion in Perth and Kinross